Cindy Cohn is an American civil liberties attorney specializing in Internet law. She represented Daniel J. Bernstein and the Electronic Frontier Foundation in Bernstein v. United States.

Education 
She received her undergraduate degree at the University of Iowa and the London School of Economics and her Doctor of Jurisprudence from the University of Michigan.

Law Career 
In 1997 Cohn was recognized by California Lawyer Magazine as one of the "Lawyers of the Year" for her work. After serving for 15 years as legal director and general counsel for the Electronic Frontier Foundation, she became its executive director in 2015.

In addition to Bernstein, some of Cohn's significant cases include Hepting v. AT&T (class action against AT&T for collaborating with the National Security Agency program to wiretap and data-mine Americans' communications), In re Sony BMG Tech. litigation (class action against Sony BMG for placing dangerous digital rights management (DRM) on customers' computers), OPG v. Diebold (Diebold was held liable for sending out unfounded cease and desist notices to internet service providers (ISPs) in an effort to stop public discussion of the flaws in its electronic voting machines), and DVD CCA v. Bunner (representing Andrew Bunner against the DVD Copy Control Association defending his right to republish a computer program that he found republished elsewhere on the Internet).

Awards and honors 
In 2006 Cohn was named one of the 100 most influential lawyers in America by the National Law Journal. In November 2018, she was featured among "America's Top 50 Women In Tech" by Forbes. Cohn also serves on the board of directors of the nonprofits Human Rights Advocates and the Verified Voting Foundation.

References

External links
 Cindy Cohn's Bio on EFF Site
 Human Rights Advocates Home Page
 

21st-century American lawyers
American Jews
Copyright activists
Living people
Year of birth missing (living people)
University of Michigan Law School alumni
University of Iowa alumni
Alumni of the London School of Economics
Electronic Frontier Foundation people
20th-century American lawyers
20th-century American women lawyers
21st-century American women lawyers